Michael Meier (19 October 1928 – 3 April 2022) was a German Roman Catholic prelate.

Meier was born in Germany and was ordained to the priesthood in 1957. He served as coadjutor archbishop of the Roman Catholic Archdiocese of Mount Hagen, Papua New Guinea from 1984 to 1987 and as archbishop of the Mount Hagen Archdiocese from 1987 until his retirement in 2006.

References

1928 births
2022 deaths
German Roman Catholic archbishops
Papua New Guinean Roman Catholic archbishops
People from Hesse-Nassau